Lina Bejjani (born 29 August 1984) is a Lebanese sprinter. She competed in the women's 100 metres at the 2000 Summer Olympics, and was eliminated after coming in 7th in her heat in round one.

References

External links
 

1984 births
Living people
Athletes (track and field) at the 2000 Summer Olympics
Lebanese female sprinters
Olympic athletes of Lebanon
Place of birth missing (living people)
Olympic female sprinters